Jujubinus catenatus is a species of sea snail, a marine gastropod mollusk in the family Trochidae, the top snails.

Description
The height of the shell attains 6.5 mm.

Distribution
This species occurs in the Mediterranean SEa off Sicily at depths between 45 m and 70 m.

References

 Ardovini R. (2006). Jujubinus catenatus sp. n. (Gastropoda, Trochidae) del Canale di Sicilia. Malacologia - Mostra mondiale (Cupra Marittima) 52: 6–7

External links

catenatus
Gastropods described in 2006